Bashir Qamari (10 January 1951 – 24 June 2021) was a Moroccan literary critic, novelist and playwright.

Biography
Qamari was born in Nador in 1951. He studied Arabic literature at the Mohammed V University in Rabat (1975 MA, 1987 PhD). He was professor at the faculty of literature in Kenitra and taught contemporary literature at the Mohammed V University in Rabat.

He started working for Al-Alam in 1972, then he joined the Union of Writers of Morocco in 1976, where he became a member of its central office from 1996 to 2004.

On 24 June 2021, he died in Rabat due to illness.

References

Bibliography
 QAMARI, Bashir. al-Muh:ârib wa bi-l-aslih:a. Kenitra: al-Bűkîlî li-l-Nashr, 1995. (the fighter and his weapons)
 QAMARI, Bashir. al-Tinnîn . Rabat: Űbtîmâ, 1998.(the dragon)
 QAMARI, Bashir. Fî al-infitâh al-nas:s: wa-l-qirâ´. Rabat: Qâfila al-Kitâb, 2002. (literary criticism)
 QAMARI, Bashir. Fî al-tah:lîl al-darâmâturdjî lil-nas:s. Tánger: Manshűrât Shirâ`, 1999. (analysis and dramaturgy of texts)
 QAMARI, Bashir. H:afriyât al-mudun. Kenitra: al-Bűkîlî li-l-Nashr, 1996. (on excavations)
 QAMARI, Bashir. H:arb al-basűs. (the war of camels)
 QAMARI, Bashir. "Huwiyya al-naqd al-adabî bi-l-Magrib". in: Madini, Ahmad Hadjmuri Abd al-Fattah eds., Al-Adab al-magribi al-h:adîth `alâmât wa qas:âs:id. Rabat: Manshűrât Râbit:a Udabâ` al-Magrib, 2006, 65-98. (on literary criticism in Morocco)
 QAMARI, Bashir. Iklîdin: tarâdjîdiâ malh:amiyya. Kenitra: Al-Bűkîlî lil-T:ibâ`a wa-l-Nashr wa-l-Tawzî, 2002.  (Ekledin: a  tragic epic)
 QAMARI, Bashir. Madjâzât dirâsât fî al-ibdâ`al-`arabî al-mu`âs.ir. Beirut: Dâr al-Âdâb , 2000. (on contemporary Arab literature)
 QAMARI, Bashir. Radj`a Laylâ al-`Amariyya. Rabat: Qâfila al-Kitâb, 1999.(The return of de Layla al-Amariyya. Theatre)
 QAMARI, Bashir. Shi'riyya al-nas:s: al-riwâ´î. Rabat : Al-Bayâdir , 1991.(literary criticism concerning poetry) 
 QAMARI, Bashir. Sirr al-bahlawân . Kenitra: al-Bűkîlî li-l-Nashr, 1997. (the secret of the country-side)
 QAMARI, Bashir. T:arâ´iq tah:lîl al-sard al-adabî. Rabat: Manshűrât Ittih:âd al-Kuttab al-Magrib, 1992. (analysis of the literary narrative)

1951 births
2021 deaths
People from Nador
Moroccan dramatists and playwrights
Moroccan male writers
Male dramatists and playwrights
Academic staff of Mohammed V University
Moroccan literary critics
Mohammed V University alumni
20th-century dramatists and playwrights
20th-century male writers
20th-century non-fiction writers
21st-century non-fiction writers
21st-century male writers
20th-century Moroccan writers
21st-century Moroccan writers
Male non-fiction writers